Symvoulos Epicheiriseon (Greek: Σύμβουλος Επιχειρήσεων, English: Council of Businesses) is a newspaper that features mainly economic news from the Patras area.  It is based in Patras in Achaea, southwestern Greece. It was first published in 1987 and was a monthly newspaper until 1994, it became biweekly during that time.  Since 2000, it appears weekly.

See also
List of newspapers in Greece

References
The first version of the article is translated and is based from the article at the Greek Wikipedia (el:Main Page)

Greek-language newspapers
Newspapers published in Patras
Publications established in 1987
Weekly newspapers published in Greece
1987 establishments in Greece

el:Σύμβουλος Επιχειρήσεων (Εφημερίδα Αχαΐας)